The Military Ordinariate of the Netherlands  is a military ordinariate of the Roman Catholic Church. Immediately subject to the Holy See, it provides pastoral care to Roman Catholics serving in the Dutch Armed Forces and their families.

History
It was established as a military vicariate on 16 April 1957 and elevated to a military ordinariate on 21 July 1986. Since 1993, no military ordinaries have been appointed.

Office holders

Military vicars
 Bernard Jan Alfrink (appointed 1957 – retired 1975)
 Johannes Gerardus Maria Willebrands (appointed 6 December 1975 – resigned 22 November 1982)
 Ronald Philippe Bär, O.S.B. (appointed 22 November 1982 – became Military Ordinary 21 July 1986)

Military ordinaries
 Ronald Philippe Bär, O.S.B. (appointed 21 July 1986 – resigned 13 March 1993).
No military ordinaries appointed since 1993:
 Joseph Marianus Punt (appointed 1 April 1995 as apostolic administrator, - retired 1 June 2020).
Everardus Johannes de Jong (appointed 1 June 2020 as apostolic administrator - now)

See also
 Catholic Church in the Netherlands

References

 Military Ordinariate of the Netherlands (Catholic-Hierarchy)
 Military Ordinariate of the Netherlands (GCatholic.org)

Catholic Church in the Netherlands
Netherlands, Military Ordinariate of the
Netherlands